Taska may refer to:

Taska, Mississippi, a community in the United States
Táska, a village in Hungary
Taska Film, an Estonian film production company
Ilmar Taska (born 1953), Estonian filmmaker and writer
Kristian Taska (born 1973), Estonian filmmaker